Salibacterium qingdaonense is a Gram-positive and haloalkaliphilic bacterium from the genus of Salibacterium which has been isolated from crude sea salt near Qingdao in China.

References

 

Bacillaceae
Bacteria described in 2007